Arm River may refer to:

Rivers
 Arm River (Saskatchewan), Saskatchewan
 Arm River (Tasmania), a tributary of Mersey River (Tasmania), Australia

Places
 Rural Municipality of Arm River No. 252, a rural municipality in Saskatchewan
 Arm River (electoral district), a provincial electoral district in Saskatchewan
 Arm River-Watrous, a provincial electoral district in Saskatchewan
 Regina—Arm River, the former name of the federal electoral district Regina—Lumsden—Lake Centre, Saskatchewan

See also
 Arm (disambiguation)